Mateus de Brito Júnior was the Angolan minister for public works and urbanization in the 1994 government of Jose Eduardo dos Santos.

References

External links
http://www.redeangola.info/morreu-vice-presidente-da-sonangol/ 
https://www.makaangola.org/2013/08/margoso-urban-development-for-the-rich-eviction-for-the-poor/

Living people
Year of birth missing (living people)
20th-century Angolan politicians
Place of birth missing (living people)